Big Spring, Kentucky is an unincorporated community in Breckinridge County (west part) in the Central Time Zone, as well as in Meade County (northeast part) and Hardin County (southeast part) in the Eastern Time Zone in the U.S. state of Kentucky.

Big Spring takes its name from a spring which emerges near the town site, then sinks underground.  A post office was established for the community in 1826.

Notable person

Charles Harwood Moorman, United States federal judge

References

Unincorporated communities in Breckinridge County, Kentucky
Unincorporated communities in Hardin County, Kentucky
Unincorporated communities in Meade County, Kentucky
Unincorporated communities in Kentucky